Pennsylvania House of Representatives District 168 includes part of Delaware County. It is currently represented by Democrat Lisa Borowski.

District profile
The district includes the following areas:

Delaware County:
 Edgmont Township
 Middletown Township (PART)
 District 02 [PART, Division 03]
 District 03
 District 04
 Newtown Township
 Radnor Township

Representatives

Recent election results

References

External links
District map from the United States Census Bureau
Pennsylvania House Legislative District Maps from the Pennsylvania Redistricting Commission.  
Population Data for District 44 from the Pennsylvania Redistricting Commission.
 2018 election results.

Government of Delaware County, Pennsylvania
168